Elections were held in Southern Rhodesia in February 1980 to set the membership of the House of Assembly of the first Parliament of the independent Zimbabwe. As stipulated by the new Constitution of Zimbabwe produced by the Lancaster House Conference, the new House of Assembly was to comprise 100 members, 80 of whom would be elected by all adult citizens on a common role, and 20 of whom would be elected by whites on a separate roll. The 80 common roll members were elected using a proportional representation system in which parties selected lists of candidates for each province. To qualify for seats in a province, a party needed to achieve a threshold of ten percent of the vote, and then the seats among the eligible parties were awarded proportionately. Nine parties contested the common roll seats, putting forward a total of 626 candidates. The 20 white roll members were elected in single-member constituencies.

The result was a victory for Robert Mugabe's Zimbabwe African National Union, contesting the election as ZANU–PF, which won 57 of the 80 common roll seats, giving it a majority in the 100-member House of Assembly. Joshua Nkomo's Zimbabwe African People's Union, contesting the election as the Patriotic Front, won 20 of the 80 common roll seats, with the remaining 3 going to Abel Muzorewa's United African National Council. Ian Smith's Rhodesian Front won all 20 of the white roll seats, with most of its candidates running unopposed. As a result of the election, Robert Mugabe became Zimbabwe's first prime minister upon the country's independence on 11 April 1980.

Summary

Common roll 
Elected candidates are listed in bold.

Manicaland 
Manicaland Province was allocated 11 seats in the House of Assembly in 1980.

Mashonaland Central 
Mashonaland Central was allocated six seats in the House of Assembly in 1980.

Mashonaland East 
Mashonaland East was allocated 16 seats in the House of Assembly in 1980.

Mashonaland West 
Mashonaland West was allocated eight seats in the House of Assembly in 1980.

Matabeleland North 
Matabeleland North Province was allocated 10 seats in the House of Assembly in 1980.

Matabeleland South 
Matabeleland South Province was allocated six seats in the House of Assembly in 1980.

Midlands 
Midlands Province was allocated 12 seats in the House of Assembly in 1980.

Victoria 
Victoria Province (renamed Masvingo Province in 1982) was allocated 11 seats in the House of Assembly in 1980.

White roll 
The Rhodesian Front won all 20 white seats in the 1980 election.

References 

Election results in Zimbabwe
Zimbabwe politics-related lists